The Colourist is an American rock band from Orange County, California, formed in 2009 by Adam Castilla, Maya Tuttle, Justin Wagner, and Kollin Johannsen. The band has been inactive since Tuttle's departure in December 2016, but reunited in 2021 and are making music.

History

2007–2012: Beginnings 
Castilla and Tuttle met while performing in the band Paper Thin Walls, who rose to notoriety after being chosen to play the 2007 Led Zeppelin reunion concert in London. The name "The Colourist" was borne out of a conversation with a friend of the band—a film student who was working with a film colorist at the time. Because the name was not already used, the ensemble decided to use the British/Canadian spelling for aesthetic and availability reasons.

After years of performing concerts in their home town, the ensemble captured the eyes of major record labels during their residency at Los Angeles' Bootleg Theater. In July 2012, the band signed a record contract with Universal Republic Records.

In 2013, the band's debut single "Little Games" becoming the No.1 song on Hype Machine.

2012–2014: Debut EP and studio albums 
In late 2012 and early 2013, the ensemble spent five months in Eagle Rock, California recording fourteen songs with producer Carlos De La Garza, twelve of which went on the full length studio album. Weeks after recording was completed, the quartet performed at Coachella Valley Music and Arts Festival in Indio, California. On August 20, 2013, the band released their debut EP Lido.

On March 25, 2014, The Colourist also released their debut studio album, The Colourist.

2014–2015: Inversions and Will You Wait for Me 
In October 2014, the ensemble released their first remix EP entitled Inversions.

On March 5, 2015, radio station KSRY FM in Los Angeles published the single "When I'm Away". Laura Neumayer of The Eagle Online describes the song as "complete with a groovy guitar riff reminiscent of The Lighthouse and the Whaler's "Venice".

On May 25, 2015, "When I'm Away" was featured as the theme song on a television commercial for Hulu. At that time, it was announced that the tune will be featured on Will You Wait for Me, the third EP from the ensemble.

On July 23, 2015, "Romancing" was released streaming on several outlets, including indieshuffle.com, as the second single from the EP.

On November 9, 2015, the group announced via their Facebook page that they are working on new music, with a subsequent post early the next year that Johannsen and the ensemble would be parting ways.

2016–2020: Hiatus and side projects 

On December 18, 2016, the group announced Tuttle's departure from the band. Following Tuttle's departure the band went on a hiatus from 2016 through 2021.

2021–present: Reunion and recent developments 
On November 2, 2021, the band announced on their Twitter page they have reunited, and in December 2021, they revealed they are in the studio working on new music.

Appearances

Television Appearances 
In 2013, The Colourist starred in a national commercial and ad campaign for Nokia, which aired on primetime television for 3 months. The commercial featured the band playing their single "Little Games" to a packed audience at LA's Opheum Theater.

In March 2014, the band's sold-out performance at The Troubadour in LA was featured on Last Call With Carson Daly

On May 21, 2014, The Colourist appeared on The Late Late Show with Craig Ferguson to perform their second single "We Won't Go Home"

Other Appearances 
In October 2015, it was announced that "Little Games" would be featured on Guitar Hero Live, by Activision. It also featured with St. Lucia remix version in EA Sports football video game, FIFA 14.

Band members

Current members 
 Adam Castilla – lead vocals, guitar (2009–present)
 Justin Wagner – keyboard (2009–present)

Former members 
 Kollin Johannsen – Bass guitar (2009–2016)
 Maya Tuttle – drums/lead vocals (2009–2016)

Discography

Studio albums

Charting singles

Extended plays

Trivia 
In October 2015, Tuttle recorded the song "Back 2 U" with Raeko (the alter ego of Jason Suwito from Sir Sly).

References

External links

Alternative rock groups from California
Musical groups from Orange County, California